D. Nathan Sheets is an American economist and government official who served as Under Secretary of the Treasury for International Affairs from 2014 to 2017. He has been Global Chief Economist at Citigroup since October 2021.

Early life and education 
Sheets was born on December 23, 1964 in Salt Lake City, Utah. After graduating from Mountain View High School in Mesa, Arizona, he earned a Bachelor of Arts degree in Economics from Brigham Young University, followed by a Ph.D in Economics from the Massachusetts Institute of Technology. Sheets was the recipient of a National Science Foundation Fellowship.

Career 
From September 2014 to January 2017, Sheets served as the Under Secretary of the Treasury for International Affairs at the Department of the Treasury, serving as the principal advisor to the Secretary of the Treasury on international economic issues. He was nominated by U.S. President Barack Obama on February 12, 2014, The United States Senate confirmed him unanimously on September 18, 2014. Before working at the United States Department of the Treasury, he worked as the Global Head of International Economics at Citigroup. There, he produced economic commentary on current events, and the developing global economy. Prior to his years at Citigroup, he worked at the Federal Reserve for 18 years, in many positions, which included serving for nearly four years as the Director of the Division of International Finance from September 2007, until August 2011. He was a visiting fellow at the Peterson Institute for International Economics from February to June 2017 and Chief Economist and Head of Global Macroeconomic Research at PGIM Fixed Income from July 2017 to October 2021.

Sheets has also been serving as stake president of the Washington D.C. Stake for the Church of Jesus Christ of Latter-day Saints as of March 11, 2018.

References

External links 
 Under Secretary for International Affairs

Living people
MIT School of Humanities, Arts, and Social Sciences alumni
United States Department of the Treasury officials
Obama administration personnel
1964 births